Sunset Bay may refer to:

Canada
Sunset Bay, Alberta, a community in Lac La Biche County
Sunset Bay Estates, Ontario, in the township of Tiny

United States
Sunset Bay, New York, a census-designated place
Sunset Bay State Park, Oregon